Alan Hugh Durrett (born 13 January 1948) is a former freestyle swimmer. He competed in two events at the 1964 Summer Olympics representing Northern Rhodesia.

References

External links
 

1948 births
Living people
Northern Rhodesia people
Zambian male freestyle swimmers
Olympic swimmers of Northern Rhodesia
Swimmers at the 1964 Summer Olympics
Place of birth missing (living people)